Andrej Razdrh (born 28 October 1976) is a Slovenian professional football manager and former player. He is currently the manager of Cypriot First Division club Ethnikos Achna.

References

External links
Profile at NZS 

Living people
1976 births
Footballers from Ljubljana
Slovenian footballers
Slovenia youth international footballers
Association football midfielders
NK Svoboda Ljubljana players
NK Primorje players
NK Triglav Kranj players
NK Domžale players
Slovenian football managers
Slovenian expatriate football managers
NK Olimpija Ljubljana (2005) managers
NK Domžale managers
Ethnikos Achna FC managers
Slovenian expatriate sportspeople in Cyprus
Expatriate football managers in Cyprus
Cypriot First Division managers